Flamingos or flamingoes  are a type of wading bird in the family Phoenicopteridae, which is the only extant family in the order Phoenicopteriformes. There are four flamingo species distributed throughout the Americas (including the Caribbean), and two species native to Afro-Eurasia.

A group of flamingoes is called a "flamboyance."

Etymology 

The word may also have been influenced by the Spanish ethnonym  ("Fleming" or "Flemish").
The name of the genus, Phoenicopterus, is from the Greek); other genera names include Phoeniconaias, which means "crimson/red water nymph (or naiad)", and Phoenicoparrus, which means "crimson/red bird (though, an unknown bird of omen)".

Taxonomy and systematics
The family Phoenicopteridae was introduced by the French zoologist Charles Lucien Bonaparte in 1831, with Phoenicopterus as the type genus.

Traditionally, the long-legged Ciconiiformes, probably a paraphyletic assemblage, have been considered the flamingos' closest relatives and the family was included in the order. Usually, the ibises and spoonbills of the Threskiornithidae were considered their closest relatives within this order. Earlier genetic studies, such as those of Charles Sibley and colleagues, also supported this relationship. Relationships to the waterfowl were considered as well, especially as flamingos are parasitized by feather lice of the genus Anaticola, which are otherwise exclusively found on ducks and geese. The peculiar presbyornithids were used to argue for a close relationship between flamingos, waterfowl, and waders. A 2002 paper concluded they are waterfowl, but a 2014 comprehensive study of bird orders found that flamingos and grebes are not waterfowl, but rather are part of Columbea, along with doves, sandgrouse, and mesites.

Relationship with grebes

Recent molecular studies have suggested a relation with grebes, while morphological evidence also strongly supports a relationship between flamingos and grebes. They hold at least 11 morphological traits in common, which are not found in other birds. Many of these characteristics have been previously identified on flamingos, but not on grebes. The fossil palaelodids can be considered evolutionarily, and ecologically, intermediate between flamingos and grebes.

For the grebe-flamingo clade, the taxon Mirandornithes ("miraculous birds" due to their extreme divergence and apomorphies) has been proposed. Alternatively, they could be placed in one order, with Phoenocopteriformes taking priority.

Phylogeny
Living flamingos:

Species
Six extant flamingo species are recognized by most sources, and were formerly placed in one genus (have common characteristics) – Phoenicopterus. As a result of a 2014 publication, the family was reclassified into two genera. In 2020, the family had three recognized genera, according to HBW.

Prehistoric species of flamingo:
Elornis? Milne-Edwards, 1868 (Late Oligocene of France, Europe)
 Harrisonavis (Gervais, 1852) (Middle Oligocene–Middle Miocene of C. Europe)
 Leakeyornis (Harrison and Walker, 1976) (Early to Middle Miocene of Lake Victoria, Kenya)
 Phoeniconaias proeses (De Vis 1905) (Pliocene of Lake Kanunka, Australia)
 Phoeniconaias siamensis Cheneval et al. 1991 (Early Miocene of Mae Long Reservoir, Thailand)
 Phoeniconotius Miller 1963 (Late Oligocene of South Australia)
 Phoenicopterus copei (Miller 1963) (Late Pleistocene of North America and Mexico)
 Phoenicopterus floridanus (Brodkorb 1953) (Early Pliocene of Florida)
 Phoenicopterus minutus Howard 1955 (Late Pleistocene of California, US)
 Phoenicopterus novaehollandiae Miller 1963 (Late Oligocene of South Australia)
 Phoenicopterus stocki (Miller 1944) (Middle Pliocene of Rincón, Mexico)
 Xenorhynchopsis De Vis 1905 (Pliocene to Pleistocene of Australia)

Description
Flamingos usually stand on one leg with the other tucked beneath the body. The reason for this behaviour is not fully understood. One theory is that standing on one leg allows the birds to conserve more body heat, given that they spend a significant amount of time wading in cold water. However, the behaviour also takes place in warm water and is also observed in birds that do not typically stand in water. An alternative theory is that standing on one leg reduces the energy expenditure for producing muscular effort to stand and balance on one leg. A study on cadavers showed that the one-legged pose could be held without any muscle activity, while living flamingos demonstrate substantially less body sway in a one-legged posture.  As well as standing in the water, flamingos may stamp their webbed feet in the mud to stir up food from the bottom.

Flamingos are capable flyers, and flamingos in captivity often require wing clipping to prevent escape. A pair of African flamingos which had not yet had their wings clipped escaped from the Wichita, Kansas, zoo in 2005. One was spotted in Texas 14 years later. It had been seen previously by birders in Texas, Wisconsin and Louisiana.

Young flamingos hatch with grayish-red plumage, but adults range from light pink to bright red due to aqueous bacteria and beta-carotene obtained from their food supply. A well-fed, healthy flamingo is more vibrantly colored, thus a more desirable mate; a white or pale flamingo, however, is usually unhealthy or malnourished. Captive flamingos are a notable exception; they may turn a pale pink if they are not fed carotene at levels comparable to the wild.

Flamingos can open their bills by raising the upper jaw as well as by dropping the lower.

Behavior and ecology

Feeding

Flamingos filter-feed on brine shrimp and blue-green algae as well as insect larvae, small insects, mollusks and crustaceans, making them omnivores. Their bills are specially adapted to separate mud and silt from the food they eat, and are uniquely used upside-down. The filtering of food items is assisted by hairy structures called lamellae, which line the mandibles, and the large, rough-surfaced tongue. The pink or reddish color of flamingos comes from carotenoids in their diet of animal and plant plankton. American flamingos are a brighter red color because of the beta carotene availability in their food while the lesser flamingos are a paler pink due to ingesting a smaller amount of this pigment. These carotenoids are broken down into pigments by liver enzymes. The source of this varies by species, and affects the color saturation. Flamingos whose sole diet is blue-green algae are darker than those that get it second-hand by eating animals that have digested blue-green algae.

Vocalization sounds
Flamingos are considered very noisy birds with their noises and vocalizations ranging from grunting or growling to nasal honking. Vocalizations play an important role in parent-chick recognition, ritualized displays, and keeping large flocks together. Variations in vocalizations exist in the voices of different species of flamingos.

Lifecycle

Flamingos are very social birds; they live in colonies whose population can number in the thousands. These large colonies are believed to serve three purposes for the flamingos: avoiding predators, maximizing food intake, and using scarce suitable nesting sites more efficiently. Before breeding, flamingo colonies split into breeding groups of about 15 to 50 birds. Both males and females in these groups perform synchronized ritual displays. The members of a group stand together and display to each other by stretching their necks upwards, then uttering calls while head-flagging, and then flapping their wings. The displays do not seem directed towards an individual, but occur randomly. These displays stimulate "synchronous nesting" (see below) and help pair up those birds that do not already have mates.

Flamingos form strong pair bonds, although in larger colonies, flamingos sometimes change mates, presumably because more mates are available  to choose. Flamingo pairs establish and defend nesting territories. They locate a suitable spot on the mudflat to build a nest (the female usually selects the place). Copulation usually occurs during nest building, which is sometimes interrupted by another flamingo pair trying to commandeer the nesting site for their use. Flamingos aggressively defend their nesting sites. Both the male and the female contribute to building the nest, and to protecting the nest and egg. Same-sex pairs have been reported.

After the chicks hatch, the only parental expense is feeding. Both the male and the female feed their chicks with a kind of crop milk, produced in glands lining the whole of the upper digestive tract (not just the crop). The hormone prolactin stimulates production. The milk contains fat, protein, and red and white blood cells. (Pigeons and doves—Columbidae—also produce crop milk (just in the glands lining the crop), which contains less fat and more protein than flamingo crop milk.)

For the first six days after the chicks hatch, the adults and chicks stay in the nesting sites. At around 7–12 days old, the chicks begin to move out of their nests and explore their surroundings. When they are two weeks old, the chicks congregate in groups, called "microcrèches", and their parents leave them alone. After a while, the microcrèches merge into "crèches" containing thousands of chicks. Chicks that do not stay in their crèches are vulnerable to predators.

Status and conservation

In captivity
The first flamingo hatched in a European zoo was a Chilean flamingo at Zoo Basel in Switzerland in 1958. Since then, over 389 flamingos have grown up in Basel and been distributed to other zoos around the globe.

Greater, an at least 83-year-old greater flamingo, believed to be the oldest in the world, died at the Adelaide Zoo in Australia in January 2014.

Zoos have used mirrors to improve flamingo breeding behaviour. The mirrors are thought to give the flamingos the impression that they are in a larger flock than they actually are.

Flamingos in Ancient Roman cuisine

While many different kinds of birds were valued items in Roman food, flamingos were among the most prized in Ancient Roman cuisine. An early reference to their consumption, and especially of their tongues, is found in Pliny the Elder, who states in the Natural History: 

Although a few recipes for flamingos are found in Apicius' extant works, none refer specifically to flamingo tongues. 
220 — roasted with an egg sauce, a recipe for wood pigeons, squabs, fattened fowl; flamingo is an afterthought.
230 — boiled; parrot may be substituted.
231 — roasted with a must sauce.

Suetonius mentions flamingo tongues in his Life of Vitellius: 

Martial, the poet, devoted an ironic epigram, alluding to flamingo tongues:

There is also a mention of flamingo brains in a later, highly contentious source, detailing, in the life of Elagabalus, a food item not apparently to his liking as much as camels' heels and parrot tongues, in the belief that the latter was a prophylactic:

Other relationship with humans

 In the Americas, the Moche people of ancient Peru worshipped nature. They placed emphasis on animals, and often depicted flamingos in their art.
 Flamingos are the national bird of the Bahamas.
 Andean miners have killed flamingos for their fat, believing that it would cure tuberculosis.
 In the United States, pink plastic flamingo statues are popular lawn ornaments.

Notes

References

External links

 Flamingo Resource Centre
 Flamingo videos and photos on the Internet Bird Collection

Articles containing video clips
 
 
Taxa named by Charles Lucien Bonaparte